La Grange Road station, or La Grange station, is a train station in La Grange, Illinois. It is served by Amtrak's Illinois Zephyr and Carl Sandburg and Metra's BNSF Line. Amtrak's California Zephyr and Southwest Chief also pass by this station, but do not stop here. Parking is available along West Hillgrove and West Burlington Avenues.

As of 2018, La Grange Road is the 23rd busiest of Metra's 236 non-downtown stations, with an average of 1,452 weekday boardings.

Bus connections
Pace:
302 Ogden/Stanley
330 Mannheim/LaGrange Roads
331 Cumberland/5th Avenue

Notes

External links

La Grange Road Amtrak-Metra Station (USA Rail Guide -- Train Web)
LaGrange Road station (Chicago Railfan.net)
La Grange Road entrance from Google Maps Street View
Ashland Avenue entrance from Google Maps Street View

Amtrak stations in Illinois
Metra stations in Illinois
Former Chicago, Burlington and Quincy Railroad stations
La Grange, Illinois
Railway stations in Cook County, Illinois
Railway stations in the United States opened in 1916